Lorna C. Silverio (born Lorna F. Cillian on February 1, 1948) is a Filipina politician. She is a former employee of the now-defunct Air Manila. She is the widow of the late politician and businessman Ricardo Silverio. Lorna Silverio serves in the House of Representatives of the Philippines, representing Bulacan's 3rd district since 2016. In her first term in the House from 2001 to 2010, she succeeded Silverio, who had represented the same district.

References

People from Bulacan
1948 births
Living people
Mayors of places in Bulacan
Members of the House of Representatives of the Philippines from Bulacan
Women members of the House of Representatives of the Philippines
Lakas–CMD (1991) politicians
University of the East alumni
Women mayors of places in the Philippines